Heart and Soul: The Singles is a greatest hits album by Japanese singer/songwriter Mari Hamada, released on November 21, 1988 by Invitation to commemorate the fifth anniversary of her music career. The album compiles Hamada's singles from 1985 to 1988 and includes the new songs "Forever", "My Tears", and "Heart and Soul". It was last reissued on October 22, 2008.

Hamada's 1994 international release All My Heart features English versions of "Forever" and "My Tears", as "Heart in Motion" and "Only Love", respectively.

Heart and Soul peaked at No. 4 on Oricon's albums chart.

Track listing

Personnel 
 Michael Landau – guitar
 Tak Matsumoto – guitar
 Hiroyuki Ohtsuki – guitar
 Takashi Masuzaki – guitar
 John Pierce – bass
 Mike Porcaro – bass
 Tomonori Yamada – bass
 Yoshihiro Naruse – bass
 Kaoru Ohori – bass
 Bill Cuomo – keyboards
 Tom Keane – keyboards, backing vocals
 Yōgo Kōno – keyboards
 Yoshinobu Kojima – keyboards
 Takanobu Masuda – keyboards
 Kazuhiro Hara – manipulator
 Jeff Porcaro – drums
 John Keane – drums
 Atsuo Okamoto – drums
 Munetaka Higuchi – drums

Charts

References

External links 
  (Mari Hamada)
  (Victor Entertainment)
 
 

1988 greatest hits albums
Japanese-language compilation albums
Mari Hamada compilation albums
Victor Entertainment compilation albums

fr:Heart and Soul (album)